Chen Huijia (born April 5, 1990 in Wenzhou, Zhejiang) is a female Chinese swimmer, who competed for Team China at the 2008 Summer Olympics.

Major achievements
2005 National Games - 5th 100m breaststroke;
2007 National Championships - 1st 50m breaststroke;
2007 National Intercity Games - 3rd 100m breaststroke;
2008 National Championships - 1st 100m breaststroke
2009 Asian Swimming Championships - 1st 50m breast, 1st 100m breast, 4th 200 breast

References
 https://web.archive.org/web/20120421000321/http://2008teamchina.olympic.cn/index.php/personview/personsen/5407

1990 births
Living people
Chinese female breaststroke swimmers
Olympic swimmers of China
Sportspeople from Wenzhou
Swimmers at the 2008 Summer Olympics
World record setters in swimming
World Aquatics Championships medalists in swimming
Swimmers from Zhejiang
Asian Games medalists in swimming
Swimmers at the 2010 Asian Games
Asian Games gold medalists for China
Asian Games bronze medalists for China
Medalists at the 2010 Asian Games
21st-century Chinese women